Propalaeomeryx is an extinct genus of giraffidae. It was first named by Lydekker in 1883.

References

External links 
 Propalaeomeryx at the Paleobiology Database

Prehistoric giraffes
Prehistoric even-toed ungulate genera